Peter Buckley (2 August 1944 – 4 July 1969) was a Manx and British racing cyclist. He was a gold medalist in the road race at the 1966 British Empire and Commonwealth Games in Kingston, Jamaica.

On 2 July 1969 Buckley was seriously injured in an accident in Hebden Bridge whilst training, when he hit a loose dog. He died two days later in Chapel Allerton Hospital in Leeds because of severe head injuries. The Peter Buckley Trophy was named in his honour, and is presented annually to the winner of the British junior national road race series winner.

Palmarès

1966
1st Road race, British Empire and Commonwealth Games

1967
1st Premier Calendar series
3rd Stage 2b, Milk Race, Malvern (GBR)
2nd Stage 6b, Milk Race, New Brighton (GBR)
3rd Stage 1 Tour de Namur, Floreffe (BEL)
2nd Tour de Namur, Meux (BEL)
2nd British National Road Race Championships, Amateur

1968
1st Circuit de Saône-et-Loire (FRA)
2nd Tour de la Yonne (FRA)

1969
3rd Milk Race
1st Stage 6b, Milk Race, Caernarfon
2nd Stage 9, Milk Race, Nottingham

References

External links

Manx male cyclists
British male cyclists
Commonwealth Games gold medallists for the Isle of Man
Cyclists at the 1966 British Empire and Commonwealth Games
Cycling road incident deaths
1944 births
1969 deaths
Commonwealth Games medallists in cycling
Medallists at the 1966 British Empire and Commonwealth Games